Mourneabbey is a small civil and Roman Catholic parish in the barony of Barretts, northwest County Cork, Ireland. The parish is situated just south of Mallow, on the main Mallow-Cork Road and Rail Line. The population of the parish is about 1,000 people. There are two churches and schools in the area, Analeentha and Burnfort. The civil parish consists of 17 townlands.

History
In medieval times the area was known in Irish as An Mhóin Mhór (the Great Bog). After the abbey was founded it was named Mainistir na Móna Móire (the abbey of the Great Bog). In medieval Latin documents it was usually referred to simply as Mora. It was formerly believed that the Abbey was built c. 1199 by the Knights Templar and later turned over to the Knights Hospitaller of St. John.  The exact foundation date is not recorded but the earliest reference to it is 1290, when the 'master of Mora' witnessed a charter concerning Hospitaller properties in Dublin. Sections of the original enclosure walls with two towers still survive. The original enclosure was much larger but has been cut by modern roads and the railway embankment. Most of the original church is standing, and the large square tower at one corner of the enclosure is believed to have been a mill. In 1334 wardship of the ‘mill of Mora’ was granted to Christiana, wife of Henry Say, for a period of ten years. Another ruined building in the field south of the church may have been the monks' hall. The enclosure would have had a substantial gatehouse and a range of domestic and agricultural buildings including a refectory, an infirmary, a guesthouse, a dormitory, stables, brewhouse, forge and so on. The abbey came under the control of the McCarthys around 1500. It was closed down in 1541 after King Henry VIII ordered the dissolution of the monasteries and was granted by the crown to the McCarthys

This abbey now lies in ruins, as does Barrett's Castle, on the nearby hilltop. The castle was originally built by Cogans, the Anglo-Norman lords who founded the nearby town of Ballynamona and who donated the lands to the Hospitallers to build the abbey. The castle was said to have been destroyed by Cromwell’s forces, around 1651.

Irish War of Independence

The parish also played a major role in the Irish War of Independence. A failed ambush of British forces occurred there near the Abbey where eight volunteers lost their lives. Tomás Mac Curtain, former Lord Mayor of Cork who was killed by British forces in 1920, was also from the parish of Mourneabbey.

On 28 September 1920, the column undertook its first mission, when it captured the gun store at Mallow Military Barracks. Some 200 men from the Mallow battalion were engaged and were drawn from the following companies – Analeentha, Ahadillane, Burnfort, Lombardstown, Mourne Abbey, Mallow, Two-Pot House and Ballyclough.
Towards the end of October 1920, a sudden sweep by a large party of British military, the Battalion or Column Officer in Command, Paddy McCarthy, and many others were arrested. Paddy was replaced by Tadhg Byrne, Mallow.
Late in December 1920, British forces were carrying out many raids at night. Mallow Battalion Head Quarters ordered the establishment of night patrols in each company area and ordered that each company should put out a few armed scouts at night in areas in which raids were likely to occur. These scouts were to fire a few shots at any raiding party encountered and then withdraw, using their local knowledge of the country to evade capture. This action was intended to force crown forces to abandon their night-raiding programme. Throughout that winter, the column (and its smaller units) lay in wait and ambushed British forces moving in small numbers at sites across North Cork such as Kanturk, Glanworth, Fermoy, Meelin, Tureengarriffe near the Cork-Kerry border, Drishanebeg, Millstreet, and Charleville. Apart from ambushes, training, drilling, and scouting activities continued. In January 1921, orders were issued from National IRA Headquarters to destroy bridges and trench roads and generally make road communications impossible for the British. 
About the end of January, the specially formed Mallow Battalion (flying) moved into the Mourne Abbey area where they lay in ambush a few times, but the expected enemy did not turn up.

Ambush at Mourne Abbey

On the evening of 14 February 1921, word was received from the Battalion Column Officer in Command, Tadhg Byrne, that column members were to report to Tadhg Looney's house at Burnfort near Mourne Abbey, before dawn the next day.
Column member John Moloney in his witness statement for the Bureau of Military History (WS 1,036) recalls that sometime about 5.30am on 15 February 1921, he and his comrades moved out from Tadgh Looney's house to the bridge crossing the Clydagh river to Analeentha where they arrived at 6am.
At this point, final instructions were issued to all units and he proceeded with the other members of the Column to take up a position behind a stone-faced fence on high ground at the western side of the road (Mallow-Cork). Their position overlooked the actual site selected for the attack, Leary's Rock, from which they were distant about 150 yards.
The enemy convoy to be attacked was one escorting General Cummings, Officer in Command of Forces at Buttevant, to a meeting of the officers of the Southern Command Area.
John (Jack) Looney who a lieutenant for the Analeentha Company, Mallow Battalion recalls his side of the story in his witness statement for the Bureau of Military History (WS 1,169) the night of 14 February 1921. 
 
Michael Looney, who was injured in the ambush and died a week after the ambush at Mourne Abbey, Co. Cork.
He received a note from his Company Officer in Command, Jerome Buckley seeking mobilisation of all available members at Jordan’s Bridge at 5am the next morning (15th). 
Jordan’s Bridge was at the point where the road from Analeentha joined the main Mallow-Cork road and was approximately one mile on the Cork side of Mourne Abbey Railway Station. John notified six or seven volunteers in his own district and all reported at the assembly point at the time specified.
With about five others, John was instructed by Jerome Buckley to take up a position in the quarry on the road between Jordan’s Bridge and Analeentha and to ensure that all traffic on this road was held up from the time on which we took up our positions.
Anybody held up by their party was to be accommodated in the local quarry. They were armed with shotguns. Amongst those in his section were Tim Harold, Phil O'Shea and Jack Buckley.
Between 6am and 11am they detained several people who were passing along the road. They kept them in the quarry.
In all, 53 young men rallied to the ambush in Mourne Abbey - 43 from Mourne Abbey, mostly young farmers in their early 20s.
The military approaches
About 11am John Looney witnessed four or five lorries of military approaching from Cork on the main road at a quick rate. The first two lorries, which were about 100 yards in front of the third, passed by Jordan's Bridge and continued towards the Abbey Stores, which were approximately 150 yards beyond the bridge on the Mallow side.
The military in the lorries opened fire with a machine-gun and the man pushing the cart fell. At the same time the lorries halted. A second cart was then pushed out and the man who pushed it got back to cover.
The other lorries of military were halted at this stage at the Cork side of Jordan's Bridge. The men on the left-hand side of the lorries jumped to the ground, crossed Jordan's Bridge and entered the avenue to Joe Corry's house.

The military on the right-hand side of the lorries jumped to the ground and moved up through a high bank towards Sheehan's farm Mourneabbey and to the positions of the Burnfort company who were armed with shotguns.
Troops opened fire indiscriminately killing two, while up at Creedon's in Clogheen troops shot the Creedon brothers killing one brother and wounding the other brother.
The whole party withdrew in a westerly direction. When they had crossed about three fields, machine-gun fire was opened on them by some military who had travelled in a lorry from Jordan's Bridge by Analeentha to Monaparson Cross.
The column regrouped and continued to withdraw until they reached Clashmorgan. There they remained for a few hours and then John’s Company returned to their home area. The column went on to Horgan's farm at Nurse town.
Casualties
The Mourne Abbey Ambush resulted in the death of four IRA men - three men Patrick Flynn, Monee (25), Patrick Dorgan (22), Island, and Edmond Creedon, Clogheen (20) were shot dead, whilst another man Michael Looney, Island (30) later died of his wounds.
The men who were arrested, Patrick Ronayne, Tomas Mulcahy, Con Mulcahy, Batt Riordan, and Michael Creedon were charged and tried by Court Martial at Cork Military Detention Barracks. Patrick Ronayne and Tomas Mulcahy were found guilty and executed on 28 April 1921, their bodies were buried in the yard at Cork Prison. The other volunteers were found not guilty due to lack of evidence.
 
Major Compton Smith of the British army was kidnapped in Blarney and held in exchange for the IRA prisoners. But when Patrick Ronayne, and Tomas Mulcahy were executed Smith was executed by the IRA. Leakage regarding this engagement was attributed to a British ex-soldier who was a member of the Kanturk Battalion Column.
Brigade Officer in Command Liam Lynch held an investigation into the Mourne Abbey ambush. Lynch was uncertain that British forces had some prior knowledge of the column’s engagement. He stated: "Poor leadership and indiscipline in the local unit seemed a more likely culprit."

Sport
Today the parish has a strong sporting element. Clyda Rovers GAA club is the most successful and longest serving club. A new €1.3 Million sporting & community complex was constructed between the years of 2000 and 2010. Their Senior Ladies Football team succeeded in winning the All-Ireland  Senior Final in 2018 after years of trying for many years. They also have previously won the Junior and Intermediate All-Irelands, and became the first team to win all 3 of them.

Transport
Mourne Abbey railway station was opened on 1 May 1892 and finally closed on 9 September 1963.

References

Further reading
 Historical and Topographical Notes, Etc. on Buttevant ..., Volume 1

See also
 List of abbeys and priories in Ireland (County Cork)

Civil parishes of County Cork
Military actions and engagements during the Irish War of Independence
History of County Cork